Rostam or Rustam or Rostom is a name referring to the Persian mythical hero Rostam who was immortalized by the poet Ferdowsi in the Shahnameh (Book of Kings). It has been commonly used as a male Persian given name, and may refer to the following people:

Given name
 Rostam Farrokhzād, An ancient Persian nobleman and army chief
 Rostom of Abkhazia, ruler of the Principality of Abkhazia
 Rostom Aramovic Alagian (1916–2009), Georgian musician
 Rustam Asildarov (born 1981), leader of the Islamic State of Iraq and the Levant – Caucasus Province
 Rostam Aziz (born 1960), Tanzanian politician and businessman
 Rostom Bagdasarian (1919–1972), American artist and record producer
 Rostam Bastuni (1923–1994), first Israeli-Arab politician
 Rostam Batmanglij (born 1983), American music producer and multi-instrumentalist
 Rustam Effendi (1903–1979), Indonesian writer and member of the House of Representatives of the Netherlands
 Rustam Emomali (1987–), Tajik official, son of Emomali Rahmon
 Rostam Ghasemi (born 1964), Iranian military officer and politician
 Rostam Gorgani (fl. 1550), Persian physician who lived in India
 Rustam Ibragimbekov (born 1939), Azeri screenwriter and film director
 Rostom of Imereti (1571–1605), Georgian king
 Rostom of Kartli (1565–1658), Iranian–Georgian king and military commander
 Prince Rostom of Kartli (died 1722), Iranian–Georgian prince and military commander
 Rustam Kasimdzhanov (born 1979), Uzbek chess master
 Rustam Khan Khoyski (1888–1948), Azerbaijani statesman
 Rustam Khudzhamov (born 1982), Ukrainian footballer
 Rustam Khudiyev (born 1985), Kazakh swimmer
 Rostom Madatyan (1782–1829), Armenian-Russian general
 Rustam Minnikhanov (born 1957), Russian politician, current President of Tatarstan
 Rostam Mirlashari (born 1960), Iranian musician
 Rustam Mirza (1381–1424/25), a grandson of Timur
 Rustam Rahimov (born 1979), German-Tajik boxer
 Roustam Raza (c. 1780–1845), famous bodyguard of Napoleon Bonaparte
 Rostam Khan (sepahsalar under Safi) (c. 1588 – 1 March 1643), Iranian-Georgian military commander and official
 Rostam Khan (sepahsalar under Suleiman I) (fl. second half of the 17th century), Iranian-Georgian military commander and official
 Rostam K. Saeed (born 1964), Kurdish mathematician and professor from Iraq
 Rustam Saidov (born 1978), Uzbek boxer
 Rustam Sharipov (born 1971), Ukrainian gymnast
 Rustam Sutan Palindih (1898–1971), Indonesian film director and writer
 Roustam Tariko (born 1962), Russian entrepreneur
 Rustam Temirgaliev (born 1976), Crimean politician
 Röstäm Yaxin (1921–1993), Russian composer and pianist
 Rustam (Haqqani network), Afghan alleged Taliban militant

See also
 Rüstem, Turkish form of the name
 Rustem, Another spelling
Rostami, Disambiguation page
DRDO Rustom

Persian masculine given names